Maria Stuart may refer to:
 Mary, Queen of Scots
 Maria Stuart (biography), a biography of Mary, Queen of Scots
 Maria/Stuart, a play by Jason Grote
 Mary Stuart (play), a verse play by Friedrich Schiller

See also
 Mary, Queen of Scots (disambiguation)
 Mary Stuart (disambiguation)